Lautenschlager (German and Alsatian (usually Lautenschläger): occupational name for a player on the lute) or the accented Lautenschläger is a surname. Notable people with the surname include:

Lautenschlager
Christian Lautenschlager (1877–1954), German Grand Prix motor racing champion
Joshua Lautenschlager Kaul, sometimes known as Josh Kaul (born 1981), American lawyer, politician
Peg Lautenschlager (1955–2018), American attorney and politician
Rube Lautenschlager (1915–1992), American basketball player

Lautenschläger
Carl Lautenschläger (1888–1962), German chemist and physician
Martina Lautenschläger (born 1988), Swiss professional tennis player
Sabine Lautenschläger (born 1964), German jurist and vice-president of the Deutsche Bundesbank

See also 

30827 Lautenschläger, a minor planet named after Manfred Lautenschläger. See List of minor planets: 30001–31000#30801–30900
Manfred Lautenschläger-Stiftung, a German charitable foundation
Marschollek, Lautenschläger und Partner AG or MLP SE, a German corporation providing financial services, especially personal financial planning advisory  
Occupational surnames

German-language surnames
Surnames of German origin